Robert Herman "Stonewall" Jackson (October 26, 1921 – March 14, 2010) was an American football player and coach. He first served his country in World War II, and returned home to enroll in North Carolina A&T State University from 1946 to 1950. Jackson played fullback and linebacker at North Carolina A&T. He is the first HBCU alumnus to be drafted by a National Football League (NFL) team when he was selected by the New York Giants in the 16th round (202nd overall) of the 1950 NFL Draft. After his two-year stint in the NFL, Jackson obtained his master's degree at Springfield College. He devoted over 40 years of his life to coaching and developing competitive student athletes. Even though Jackson spent most of his career at North Carolina Central University, he also coached football, basketball, track, and tennis at Johnson C. Smith University, St. Augustine's University, Shaw University, and Texas Southern University.  He also served as a faculty member, trainer, and equipment manager at some of these institutions.

Jackson was a native of Mineral, Virginia. He died on March 14, 2010, at Capital Rehabilitation and Nursing Center in Raleigh, North Carolina. He was interred at Arlington National Cemetery.

Head coaching record

Football

Notes

References

External links
 North Carolina Central University Athletic Hall of Fame profile
 

1921 births
2010 deaths
American football fullbacks
American football linebackers
Johnson C. Smith Golden Bulls football coaches
New York Giants players
North Carolina A&T Aggies football players
North Carolina Central Eagles football coaches
Shaw Bears football coaches
St. Augustine's Falcons football coaches
Texas Southern Tigers football coaches
North Carolina Central University faculty
Springfield College (Massachusetts) alumni
United States Army personnel of World War II
Sportspeople from Allentown, Pennsylvania
People from Louisa County, Virginia
Coaches of American football from Pennsylvania
Players of American football from Pennsylvania
African-American coaches of American football
African-American players of American football
20th-century African-American sportspeople
21st-century African-American people